Ceragenins, or cationic steroid antimicrobials (CSAs), are synthetically-produced, small-molecule chemical compounds consisting of a sterol backbone with amino acids and other chemical groups attached to them. These compounds have a net positive charge that is electrostatically attracted to the negative-charged cell membranes of certain viruses, fungi and bacteria. CSAs have a high binding affinity for such membranes (including Lipid A) and are able to rapidly disrupt the target membranes leading to rapid cell death. While CSAs have a mechanism of action that is also seen in antimicrobial peptides, which form part of the body's innate immune system, they avoid many of the difficulties associated with their use as medicines.

Ceragenins were invented by Dr. Paul B. Savage of Brigham Young University's Department of Chemistry and Biochemistry. In data previously presented by Dr. Savage and other researchers, CSAs have been shown to have broad spectrum antibacterial activity.  Dr. Derya Unutmaz, Associate Professor of Microbiology and Immunology at the Vanderbilt University School of Medicine, tested several CSAs in his laboratory for their ability to kill HIV directly.  According to Unutmaz, "We have some preliminary but very exciting results.  But we would like to formally show this before making any claims that would cause unwanted hype."

On February 6, 2006, researchers (including Dr. Paul B. Savage) announced that a Ceragenin compound, CSA-54, appears to inactivate HIV. This conclusion seems to still be awaiting peer review.

References

Antibiotics
Steroids